Ciliopagurus krempfi is a species of hermit crab from the Indo-Pacific.

References

Hermit crabs
Crustaceans described in 1952